Beijing No. 25 Middle School or Beijing No. 25 High School ( "Beijing No. 25 Secondary School") is a junior high school and senior high school in Dongcheng District, Beijing, China. It includes a "Sino-Canadian" education program in which students graduate with both Chinese and Nova Scotia Canadian high school diplomas.

History
The American Congregational Church established the Yu Ying School in 1864. In 2005 the school's Canadian Certified High School Program was established.

References

Notes

External links
 Beijing No. 25 Middle School
 Beijing No. 25 Middle School Sino-Canadian Program

High schools in Beijing
Junior secondary schools in China
Schools in Dongcheng District, Beijing